The women's middle distance (7.4 kilometers) event at the 2011 Asian Winter Games was held on 2 February at the Almaty Biathlon and Cross-Country Ski Complex.

Schedule
All times are Almaty Time (UTC+06:00)

Results
Legend
DSQ — Disqualified

References

External links
Official Website

Women's middle distance